The 1947 Toronto Argonauts season was the 58th season for the team since the franchise's inception in 1873. The team finished in second place in the Interprovincial Rugby Football Union with a 7–4–1 record and qualified for the playoffs for the ninth consecutive season. The Argonauts defeated the Ottawa Rough Riders in a two-game total-points IRFU Final series before winning the Eastern Final over the Ottawa Trojans. The two-time defending Grey Cup champion Argonauts faced the Winnipeg Blue Bombers for the third time in a row in the Grey Cup game. Toronto won their eighth Grey Cup championship by a score of 10–9 for the first three-peat in franchise history.

Preseason

Regular season

Standings

Schedule

Postseason

Grey Cup

November 29 @ Varsity Stadium (Attendance: 18,885)

References

Toronto Argonauts seasons
Grey Cup championship seasons
1947 Canadian football season by team